Lamellaria latens is a species of small, slug-like sea snail, a marine gastropod mollusc in the family Velutinidae. It is native to the northeastern Atlantic Ocean and the Mediterranean Sea where it feeds on colonial ascidians (sea squirts).

Description

The shell is not visible externally because it is completely covered by the mantle. The shell is thin, smooth and fragile, and consists of two whorls with an unobtrusive spire and a somewhat depressed profile. The largest whorl is equivalent to the total height of the shell. The aperture is extremely wide. The part of the animal that is visible is the mantle, and this is smoother and less domed than the rather similar  Lamellaria perspicua. The colour varies but tends to be some shade of tan or brown, with darker flecks.

References

Velutinidae
Gastropods described in 1776
Taxa named by Otto Friedrich Müller